The 1952 United States presidential election in West Virginia took place on November 4, 1952, as part of the 1952 United States presidential election. West Virginia voters chose eight representatives, or electors, to the Electoral College, who voted for president and vice president.

West Virginia was won by Adlai Stevenson (D–Illinois), running with Senator John Sparkman, with 51.92 percent of the popular vote, against Columbia University President Dwight D. Eisenhower (R–New York), running with California Senator Richard Nixon, with 48.08 percent of the popular vote.

Even in the midst of a national landslide for Eisenhower, this was the first time a losing Democrat carried West Virginia since 1888, and the first time a Democrat who lost the popular vote carried West Virginia since 1880. West Virginia's Democratic tilt displayed the strong Democratic lean the state would have for the rest of the 20th century, voting Republican only three times between 1932 and 1996 (in the Republican landslides of 1956, 1972, and 1984).

West Virginia and Kentucky were the only states outside the former Confederacy that were carried by the Democratic Party in 1952.

Results

Results by county

References

West Virginia
1952
1952 West Virginia elections